The Cable Guy is a 1996 American psychological thriller comedy film directed by Ben Stiller, written by Lou Holtz Jr. and starring Jim Carrey and Matthew Broderick. It was released in the United States on June 14, 1996. The film co-stars Leslie Mann, Jack Black, George Segal, Diane Baker, Eric Roberts, Owen Wilson, Janeane Garofalo, David Cross, Andy Dick, Stiller, and Bob Odenkirk.

In the film, Carrey plays an eccentric cable installer who becomes overly intrusive in the life of a customer, played by Broderick. The film was a box office success, though not to the extent of many of Carrey's previous films. It received mixed reception from critics, but has since attained a cult following.

Plot
Architect Steven Kovacs moves into an apartment after a failed marriage proposal to his girlfriend Robin Harris. Taking advice from his friend Rick, Steven bribes cable installer Ernie "Chip" Douglas into giving him free movie channels. Chip gets Steven to hang out with him the next day and makes him one of his "preferred customers". Chip takes Steven to the city's central satellite dish, where he confides to Steven about being raised by television due to the frequent absences of his single mother. Chip soon proves to be intrusive as he crashes a basketball game between Steven and his friends and leaves multiple messages on Steven's answering machine. Following a knight's duel between Chip and Steven at Medieval Times, Steven finds that Chip has secretly installed an expensive home theater system in his living room as a gift in return for Steven's friendship. Although Steven declines the gift, he agrees to host a party attended by Chip's other preferred customers before having the system returned. In the fervor of the party, Steven sleeps with a young guest, whom Chip reveals the next morning to have been a prostitute that he had hired specifically for Steven. Upon this revelation, Steven angrily ejects Chip from his apartment.

To make amends, Chip tracks down Robin, who is dating another man. A disguised Chip severely beats the man in a restaurant bathroom and tells him to stay away from Robin. He later upgrades Robin's cable, ostensibly as a gift from Steven. Robin decides to get back together with Steven as a result. However, when Chip informs Steven of his role in reuniting him with Robin, Steven politely ends his relationship with Chip. Devastated, Chip sets out on a series of vengeful acts. He gets Steven arrested for possession of stolen property and mocks him through a prison visitation window. After being released on bail, Steven is further embarrassed when Chip attends dinner with his family and Robin. Following a sexualized version of the game Password, Steven openly berates Chip and punches him. The next day, Steven is fired from his job when Chip transmits a privately recorded conversation, in which Steven insults his boss, onto the company's computers.

Rick investigates Chip at Steven's request and finds that Chip was fired from the cable company for stalking customers, and uses the names of various television characters as aliases such as Chip and Ernie Douglas from My Three Sons, George Jetson from The Jetsons, and Larry Tate from Bewitched. Chip calls Steven that night, telling him he is paying Robin a visit. After visiting Robin's empty apartment, Steven tracks them down to the satellite dish, where Chip holds Robin hostage in a rainstorm. After a physical altercation and a chase, Steven is able to save Robin. As the police arrive, Chip apologizes to Steven for being a bad friend. Chip, proclaiming that he must "kill the babysitter" to prevent others from becoming like him, dives backward from the top of a ladder onto the satellite dish, knocking out the television signal to the entire city. Chip survives the fall with an injured back, and bids Steven farewell before being hauled away in a rescue helicopter. Steven and Robin kiss. When one of the paramedics addresses him as "buddy", Chip asks the paramedic if he is truly his buddy, to which the paramedic replies "Yeah, sure you are", causing Chip to smile deviously.

Cast

Production
First-time screenwriter Lou Holtz Jr. had the idea for The Cable Guy while working as a prosecutor in Los Angeles, declaring that he once saw a cable company employee in the hallway of his mother's apartment building and started thinking, "What's he doing here so late?" The screenplay became the subject of a bidding war, won by Columbia Pictures at a price of $750,000, plus a $250,000 additional bonus if the movie got made. The role of the Cable Guy was originally sold with Chris Farley attached to star, but he later dropped out due to scheduling difficulties.  Adam Sandler was also considered for the role of the Cable Guy.

Jim Carrey joined the production, receiving a then record $20 million to star. Following Carrey's signing, Columbia hired Judd Apatow to produce. The studio rebuffed Apatow's interest in directing, but accepted his suggestion to invite Ben Stiller, star of his eponymous show on which Apatow had worked.  Stiller was considered to play the Steven Kovacs character before it was offered to Matthew Broderick.

The original screenplay by Lou Holtz Jr. was a lighter comedy, described by Apatow as "a What About Bob? annoying friend movie" where the Cable Guy was a likeable loser who intrudes upon the cable subscriber's life, but never in a physically threatening way. Carrey, Apatow and Stiller liked the setup of "somebody who is really smart with technology invading somebody's life", and opted to add slapstick and darker tones, changing into a satire of thrillers such as Cape Fear, Unlawful Entry and The Hand That Rocks the Cradle. The dialogue would also fit Carrey's style of comedy.

Holtz wrote four additional drafts, each one darker than the previous, before leaving the project and giving Apatow the opportunity to take over the writing. Apatow and Stiller visited Carrey as he was filming Ace Ventura: When Nature Calls in South Carolina, and over a few days, riffed a lot of the set pieces that were added to the script, and further explored how Carrey wanted to perform the character. Apatow took the film to the Writers Guild for arbitration to get a writing credit but ultimately Holtz retained sole credit for the script. Apatow expressed frustration at not getting credit but acknowledged that as he was also a producer on the film, the Writers Guild requirements are set very high to protect writers.

The final script had elements so disturbing that Columbia heard many complaints regarding certain scenes. In turn, Apatow declared that the studio did not specifically order removals, "but we took [the scenes] out as part of the natural evolution of our creative process". Stiller stated that he shot every scene with "a dark version and a light version", and that he was surprised that the studio did not object to the violent ending.

The fight sequence at Medieval Times between Chip (Jim Carrey) and Steven (Matthew Broderick) is an homage to the Star Trek episode "Amok Time"—including the use of Vulcan weapons (lirpa), the dialogue, and the background music. Director Ben Stiller is an admitted Star Trek fan.

Release

The film grossed $19,806,226 on its opening weekend. At the time, it had the highest opening weekend for a Ben Stiller film, holding this record until 2000 when Meet the Parents surpassed it. It grossed a total $60,240,295 in the North American domestic market, and $42,585,501 outside the United States, making a total of $102,825,796 worldwide gross, but failed to reach domestic projected numbers Jim Carrey brought to his previous movies. Apatow said "people looked at it as a failure because it didn't make even more money." Despite the critical perception that the movie was a disappointment, it made a profit in excess of its $47 million production budget.

The film was released in the United Kingdom on July 12, 1996, and opened on #2, behind Mission: Impossible.

It was released on VHS on December 3, 1996, DVD on September 15, 1997, and a 15th anniversary Blu-ray release on March 1, 2011. Sony re-issued the latter format as a manufacture-on-demand title on December 17, 2019.

Reception
On review aggregator Rotten Tomatoes, the film holds an approval rating of 55% based on 80 reviews, with an average rating of 5.7/10. The website's critical consensus states, "The Cable Guys dark flashes of thought-provoking, subversive wit are often—but not always—enough to counter its frustratingly uneven storytelling approach." On Metacritic, the film received a weighted average score of 56  based 28 reviews, indicating "mixed or average reviews". Audiences surveyed by CinemaScore gave the film a grade "C+" on scale of A to F.

The Cable Guy has been regarded as having a darker tone than most of Carrey's previous work. Audiences and film critics had mixed reactions to the change. The film was on J. Hoberman's Top 10 best of the year. Roger Ebert included The Cable Guy in his worst of the year list for 1996, though colleague Gene Siskel disagreed, calling it "a very good film. [Carrey's] best since The Mask". Ebert found Carrey's performance so bizarre and creepy, it undermined the entire story, and felt the movie was more of a dark comedy than was necessary.

In spite of its mixed reception, the film has achieved a cult following, and has been attributed to helping Carrey pursue more serious roles such as The Truman Show and Eternal Sunshine of the Spotless Mind. Carrey named the movie as one his favorite that he worked on:I have odd favorites that may not be for kids, but The Cable Guy is one of my favorite movies. I think Ben Stiller did an amazing job, and it's populated with the greatest comedy actors of our day when they were just coming into their power. I love that character. That character is all of us: we were all raised by the TV.

Accolades

 1997 MTV Movie Awards
 Best Comic Performance – Jim Carrey (Won)
 Best Villain – Jim Carrey (Won)
 Best Fight – Jim Carrey vs. Matthew Broderick (Nominated)
 1997 Kids' Choice Awards
 Favorite Movie Actor – Jim Carrey (Won)
 1996 Stinkers Bad Movie Awards
 Most Painfully Unfunny Comedy (Nominated)

Soundtrack 

The Cable Guy: Original Motion Picture Soundtrack was released on May 21, 1996 via Work Group. It consists of previously unreleased songs, largely of alternative rock and heavy metal bands, and includes the first solo recording by Jerry Cantrell of Alice in Chains fame. The soundtrack includes Jim Carrey's version of Jefferson Airplane's "Somebody to Love" which was performed by him in the film. It also includes a song from $10,000 Gold Chain, a side project of Pearl Jam lead guitarist Mike McCready. White Zombie's "More Human than Human" is featured in a dramatic scene of the film but was not included on the soundtrack release.

Cantrell's "Leave Me Alone" served as the soundtrack's promotional vehicle and was released as a single, peaking at No. 14 on Billboard's Mainstream Rock Tracks chart. It had a music video that featured various footage from Cable Guy in a dark manner typical of Cantrell's style. It also had Jim Carrey's haunting face reaching out of a television screen observing Cantrell. The music video was included as a bonus feature on the 15th-anniversary edition Blu-ray of The Cable Guy in 2011.

While the album as a whole was not well received, Stephen Thomas Erlewine of AllMusic noted that "Leave Me Alone" positively "rocks as hard as any Alice in Chains track". The track "Standing Outside a Broken Phone Booth with Money in My Hand" gained popularity for its appearance in the film and reached No. 1 on the Billboard Alternative Songs chart in 1996.

Track listing

In popular culture 
 When Carrey guest hosted Saturday Night Live during season 40, one of his relatives in the "Carrey Family Reunion" sketch paid tribute to Chip (and was played by Jay Pharaoh).
 Carrey reprised the role of Chip in a Verizon 5G commercial run during Super Bowl LVI.

References

External links

 
 
 
 

1996 films
1996 comedy films
1990s black comedy films
1990s comedy thriller films
American buddy comedy films
American black comedy films
American satirical films
American comedy thriller films
Columbia Pictures films
Films scored by John Ottman
Films about stalking
Films about television
Films directed by Ben Stiller
Films produced by Judd Apatow
Films shot in California
Home invasions in film
1990s English-language films
1990s American films